WMXY (98.9 FM "Mix 98.9") is a commercial radio station in Youngstown, Ohio.  It broadcasts a mainstream adult contemporary radio format and switches to all-Christmas music for much of November and December.  WMXY is owned by iHeartMedia, Inc.  It is the Youngstown network affiliate for the Delilah syndicated music and call-in show in the evening, and carries the Ellen K Weekend Show Saturdays and Casey Kasem's classic American Top 40 on Sundays.

WMXY has an effective radiated power (ERP) of 5,900 watts.  The transmitter is off South Avenue in Boardman, Ohio.  WMXY broadcasts in the HD Radio hybrid format.  The HD-2 digital subchannel formerly carried an alternative rock format branded as "Indie Radio."

History

WKBN-FM

The station first signed on the air on August 26, 1947.  It began as WKBN-FM, a sister station to WKBN (AM 570), and six years later, would be joined by WKBN-TV.  The two radio stations are co-owned to this day, although the TV station was spun off to a different owner in 1997.  In the station's earliest years, WKBN-FM and WKBN would mostly simulcast.  The two stations were CBS Radio Network affiliates, carrying CBS's schedule of dramas, comedies, news, sports and other network programming.

Eventually, as network programming moved from radio to television, WKBN-AM-FM switched to a middle of the road format of popular music, news, sports and talk in the 1950s.  By the mid-60s, the Federal Communications Commission began requiring FM stations to carry different programming from their AM stations for most of the day.

WKBN-FM became a beautiful music outlet.  It was mostly automated, airing quarter hour sweeps of mostly instrumental cover versions of popular adult hits, as well as Broadway and Hollywood show tunes.  It later began calling itself "Stereo 99" after installing FM stereo equipment.  The format proved quite successful, playing in many Youngstown area stores and offices.  Like many easy listening stations nationwide, it was at its peak of profitability from the late 1960s through the mid-1980s.

WMXY
By the mid-80s, the audience for easy listening was aging while advertisers usually seek young to middle aged customers.  WKBN switched from its easy listening format to soft adult contemporary by 1989.  Most of the dayparts remained automated, however, and the Stereo 99 moniker remained.

By the end of the 20th century, the station needed to further brighten up its image and sound more youthful.  WKBN-FM changed its call sign to WMXY and adopted the slogan "Mix 98.9", with a Hot AC format.  In early 2012, WMXY adjusted its music mix back to mainstream AC, using Clear Channel's Premium Choice AC music logs and continuing to carry Delilah at night.  On Saturdays and Sundays, the station would switch over to the "Time Warp Weekend", where all music heard was from the 80s and early 90s.

References

External links

MXY
Mainstream adult contemporary radio stations in the United States
IHeartMedia radio stations
Radio stations established in 1947
1947 establishments in Ohio